Marc Sway (born 25 June 1979 in Männedorf), is a Swiss soul and pop singer. Since 2003 he has released five albums and from 2013 Sway acts as a juror and vocal coach in the television singing competition The Voice of Switzerland.

Discography

Albums 
 2003 – Marc's Way
 2008 – One Way
 2010 – Tuesday Songs
 2012 – Soul Circus
 2014 – Black & White

Singles 
 2003 – "Natural High"
 2003 – "Ready for the Ride"
 2006 – "We're on Fire" (Marc Sway, Daniel Kandlbauer, Kisha & Tanja Dankner)
 2007 – "Hemmigslos liebe" (Fabienne Louves & Marc Sway)
 2008 – "Severina"
 2010 – "Losing"
 2011 – "Din Engel"
 2012 – "Non, Non, Non"
 2014 – "Feel the same"

References

External links 
Biography by Laut.de
Marc Sway on Internet Movie Database

1979 births
Living people
21st-century Swiss  male singers